The Southern Military Command ( or CMS) is one of eight Military Commands of the Brazilian Army. The Southern Military Command is responsible for the defence of the states of Rio Grande do Sul, Paraná and Santa Catarina.

Current Structure 

 Southern Military Command (Comando Militar do Sul) in Porto Alegre
 HQ Company Southern Military Command (Companhia de Comando do Comando Militar do Sul) in Porto Alegre
 3rd Guard Cavalry Regiment (3º Regimento de Cavalaria de Guarda) in Porto Alegre 
 3rd Signals Battalion (3º Batalhão de Comunicações de Exército) in Porto Alegre
 3rd Military Police Battalion (3º Batalhão de Polícia do Exército) in Porto Alegre
 1st Military Intelligence Company (1ª Companhia de Inteligência) in Porto Alegre
 8th Motorized Infantry Brigade (8ª Brigada de Infantaria Motorizada) in Pelotas
 HQ Company 8th Motorized Infantry Brigade (Companhia de Comando da 8ª Brigada de Infantaria Motorizada) in Pelotas
 9th Motorized Infantry Battalion (9º Batalhão de Infantaria Motorizado) in Pelotas
 18th Motorized Infantry Battalion (18º Batalhão de Infantaria Motorizado) in Sapucaia do Sul
 19th Motorized Infantry Battalion (19º Batalhão de Infantaria Motorizado) in São Leopoldo
 6th Field Artillery Group (6º Grupo de Artilharia de Campanha) in Rio Grande
 6th Signals Battalion (6º Batalhão de Comunicações) in Bento Gonçalves
 8th Logistics Battalion (8º Batalhão Logístico) in Porto Alegre
 8th Mechanized Cavalry Squadron (8º Esquadrão de Cavalaria Mecanizado) in Porto Alegre
 8th Military Police Platoon (8º Pelotão de Polícia do Exército) in Pelotas
 Army Artillery Command (Comando de Artilharia do Exército) in Porto Alegre
 HQ Battery Army Artillery Command (Bateria de Comando do Comando de Artilharia do Exército) in Porto Alegre
 13th Field Artillery Group (13º Grupo de Artilharia de Campanha) in Cachoeira do Sul 
 16th Self-propelled Field Artillery Group (16º Grupo de Artilharia de Campanha Autopropulsado) in São Leopoldo
 4th Engineer Group' (4º Grupamento de Engenharia) in Porto Alegre
 HQ Company 4th Engineer Group (Companhia de Comando do 4º Grupamento de Engenharia) in Porto Alegre
 1st Railroad Battalion (1º Batalhão Ferroviário) in Lages
 3rd Combat Engineer Battalion (3º Batalhão de Engenharia de Combate) in Cachoeira do Sul
 6th Combat Engineer Battalion (6º Batalhão de Engenharia de Combate) in São Gabriel

3rd Military Region 
 3rd Military Region (3ª Região Militar) in Porto Alegre covering the Rio Grande do Sul state
 3rd Military Region Administration and Support Base (Base de Administração e Apoio da 3ª Região Militar) in Porto Alegre
 1st Foot Guard Company (1ª Companhia de Guardas) in Porto Alegre
 Porto Alegre Military Area Hospital (Hospital Militar de Área de Porto Alegre) in Porto Alegre
 Military Polyclinic Porto Alegre (Policlínica Militar do Porto Alegre) in Porto Alegre
 Alegrete Garrison Hospital (Hospital da Guarnição de Alegrete) in Alegrete
 Bagé Garrison Hospital (Hospital da Guarnição de Bagé) in Bagé
 Santa Maria Garrison Hospital (Hospital da Guarnição de Santa Maria) in Santa Maria
 Santiago Garrison Hospital (Hospital da Guarnição de Santiago) in Santiago
 8th Military Service Command (8ª Circunscrição de Serviço Militar) in Porto Alegre
 10th Military Service Command (10ª Circunscrição de Serviço Militar) in Santo Ângelo
 3rd Logistics Group (3º Grupamento Logístico) in Porto Alegre
 HQ Company 3rd Logistics Group (Companhia de Comando do 3º Grupamento Logístico) in Porto Alegre
 3rd Supply Battalion (3º Batalhão de Suprimento) in Nova Santa Rita
 3rd Military Region Regional Maintenance Park (Parque Regional de Manutenção da 3ª Região Militar) in Santa Maria
 Santa Maria Matériel Depot (Depósito de Subsistência de Santa Maria) in Santa Maria
 Santo Ângelo Matériel Depot (Depósito de Subsistência de Santo Ângelo) in Santo Ângelo
 13th Weapons and Ammunition Depot Company (13ª Companhia Depósito de Armamento e Munição) in Santa Maria

3rd Army Division 
 3rd Army Division (3ª Divisão de Exército) in Santa Maria
 HQ Company 3rd Army Division (Companhia de Comando da 3ª Divisão de Exército) in Santa Maria
 1st Signals Battalion (1º Batalhão de Comunicações) in Santo Ângelo 
 3rd Division Artillery (Artilharia Divisionária da 3ª Divisão de Exército) in Cruz Alta
 HQ Battery 3rd Division Artillery (Bateria de Comando da Artilharia Divisionária da 3ª DE) in Cruz Alta
 27th Field Artillery Group (27º Grupo de Artilharia de Campanha) in Ijuí 
 29th Self-propelled Field Artillery Group (29º Grupo de Artilharia de Campanha Autopropulsado) in Cruz Alta
 1st Mechanized Cavalry Brigade (1ª Brigada de Cavalaria Mecanizada) in Santiago
 HQ Squadron 1st Mechanized Cavalry Brigade (Esquadrão de Comando da 1ª Brigada de Cavalaria Mecanizada) in Santiago 
 1st Mechanized Cavalry Regiment (1º Regimento de Cavalaria Mecanizado) in Itaqui
 2nd Mechanized Cavalry Regiment (2º Regimento de Cavalaria Mecanizado) in São Borja
 4th Armored Cavalry Regiment (4º Regimento de Cavalaria Blindado) in São Luiz Gonzaga
 19th Mechanized Cavalry Regiment (19º Regimento de Cavalaria Mecanizado) in Santa Rosa
 19th Field Artillery Group (19º Grupo de Artilharia de Campanha) in Santiago
 9th Logistics Battalion (9º Batalhão Logístico) in Santiago
 1st Mechanized Combat Engineer Company (1ª Companhia de Engenharia de Combate Mecanizada) in São Borja
 11th Mechanized Signals Company (11ª Companhia de Comunicações Mecanizada) in Santiago 
 1st Military Police Platoon (1º Pelotão de Polícia do Exército) in Santiago 
 2nd Mechanized Cavalry Brigade (2ª Brigada de Cavalaria Mecanizada) in Uruguaiana
 HQ Squadron 2nd Mechanized Cavalry Brigade (Esquadrão de Comando da 2ª Brigada de Cavalaria Mecanizada) in Uruguaiana
 5th Mechanized Cavalry Regiment (5º Regimento de Cavalaria Mecanizado) in Quaraí
 6th Armored Cavalry Regiment (6º Regimento de Cavalaria Blindado) in Alegrete
 8th Mechanized Cavalry Regiment (8º Regimento de Cavalaria Mecanizado) in Uruguaiana
 22nd Field Artillery Group (22º Grupo de Artilharia de Campanha) in Uruguaiana
 10th Logistics Battalion (10º Batalhão Logístico) in Alegrete
 2nd Mechanized Combat Engineer Company (2ª Companhia de Engenharia de Combate Mecanizada) in Alegrete
 12th Signals Company (12ª Companhia de Comunicações) in Alegrete
 2nd Military Police Platoon (2º Pelotão de Polícia do Exército) in Uruguaiana 
 3rd Mechanized Cavalry Brigade (3ª Brigada de Cavalaria Mecanizada) in Bagé
 HQ Squadron 3rd Mechanized Cavalry Brigade (Esquadrão de Comando da 3ª Brigada de Cavalaria Mecanizada) in Bagé
 3rd Mechanized Cavalry Regiment (3º Regimento de Cavalaria Mecanizado) in Bagé 
 7th Mechanized Cavalry Regiment (7º Regimento de Cavalaria Mecanizado) in Santana do Livramento
 9th Armored Cavalry Regiment (9º Regimento de Cavalaria Blindado) in São Gabriel
 12th Mechanized Cavalry Regiment (12º Regimento de Cavalaria Mecanizado) in Jaguarão
 25th Field Artillery Group (25º Grupo de Artilharia de Campanha) in Bagé
 3rd Logistics Battalion (3º Batalhão Logístico) in Bagé
 2nd Air Defence Artillery Battery (2ª Bateria de Artilharia Anti-Aérea) in Santana do Livramento
 3rd Mechanized Combat Engineer Company (3ª Companhia de Engenharia de Combate Mecanizada) in Dom Pedrito
 13th Mechanized Signals Company (13º Companhia Comunicações Mecanizada) in São Gabriel
 3rd Military Police Platoon (3º Pelotão de Polícia do Exército) in Bagé
 6th Armored Infantry Brigade (6ª Brigada de Infantaria Blindada) in Santa Maria
 HQ Company 6th Armored Infantry Brigade (Companhia de Comando da 6ª Brigada de Infantaria Blindada) in Santa Maria
 1st Tank Regiment (1º Regimento de Carros de Combate) in Santa Maria
 4th Tank Regiment (4º Regimento de Carros de Combate) in Rosário do Sul 
 7th Armored Infantry Battalion (7º Batalhão de Infantaria Blindado) in Santa Cruz do Sul 
 29th Armored Infantry Battalion (29º Batalhão de Infantaria Blindado) in Santa Maria
 3rd Self-propelled Field Artillery Group (3º Grupo de Artilharia de Campanha Autopropulsado) in Santa Maria
 12th Armored Combat Engineer Battalion (12º Batalhão de Engenharia de Combate Blindado) in Alegrete
 4th Logistics Battalion (4º Batalhão Logístico) in Santa Maria
 6th Mechanized Cavalry Squadron (6º Esquadrão de Cavalaria Mecanizado) in Santa Maria
 6th Air Defence Artillery Battery (6ª Bateria de Artilharia Anti-Aérea) in Santa Maria
 3rd Armored Signals Company (3ª Companhia de Comunicações Blindada) in Santa Maria 
 26th Military Police Platoon (26º Pelotão de Polícia do Exército) in Santa Maria

5th Military Region 
 5th Military Region (5ª Região Militar) in Curitiba covering the Paraná and Santa Catarina states
 5th Military Region Administration and Support Base (Base de Administração e Apoio da 5ª Região Militar) in Curitiba
 5th Military Region Regional Maintenance Park (Parque Regional de Manutenção da 5ª Região Militar) in Curitiba
 5th Supply Battalion (5º Batalhão de Suprimento) in Curitiba
 5th Military Police Company (5ª Companhia de Polícia do Exército) in Curitiba
 Curitiba General Hospital (Hospital Geral de Curitiba) in Curitiba
 Florianópolis Garrison Hospital (Hospital da Guarnição de Florianópolis) in Florianópolis
 15th Military Service Circumscription (15ª Circunscrição de Serviço Militar) in Curitiba
 16th Military Service Circumscription (16ª Circunscrição de Serviço Militar) in Florianópolis

5th Army Division 
 5th Army Division (5ª Divisão de Exército) in Curitiba 
 HQ Company 5th Army Division (Companhia de Comando da 5ª Divisão de Exército) in Curitiba
 14th Mechanized Cavalry Regiment (14º Regimento de Cavalaria Mecanizado) in São Miguel
 27th Logistics Battalion (27º Batalhão Logístico) in Curitiba 
 5th Division Artillery (Artilharia Divisionária da 5ª Divisão de Exército) in Curitiba
 HQ Battery 5th Division Artillery (Bateria de Comando da Artilharia Divisionária da 5ª DE) in Curitiba 
 15th Self-propelled Field Artillery Group (15º Grupo de Artilharia de Campanha Autopropulsado) in Lapa
 5th Armored Cavalry Brigade (5ª Brigada de Cavalaria Blindada) in Ponta Grossa 
 HQ Squadron 5th Armored Cavalry Brigade (Esquadrão de Comando da 5ª Brigada de Cavalaria Blindada) in Ponta Grossa 
 3rd Tank Regiment (3º Regimento de Carros de Combate) in Ponta Grossa
 5th Tank Regiment (5º Regimento de Carros de Combate) in Rio Negro 
 13th Armored Infantry Battalion (13º Batalhão de Infantaria Blindado) in Ponta Grossa 
 20th Armored Infantry Battalion (20º Batalhão de Infantaria Blindado) in Curitiba 
 5th Self-propelled Field Artillery Group (5º Grupo de Artilharia de Campanha Autopropulsado) in Curitiba 
 5th Armored Combat Engineer Battalion (5° Batalhão de Engenharia de Combate Blindado) in Porto União
 5th Logistics Battalion (5º Batalhão Logístico) in Curitiba
 5th Mechanized Cavalry Squadron (5º Esquadrão de Cavalaria Mecanizado) in Castro 
 5th Armored Signals Company (5ª Companhia de Comunicações Blindada) in Curitiba 
 25th Military Police Platoon (25º Pelotão de Polícia do Exército) in Ponta Grossa
 14th Motorized Infantry Brigade (14ª Brigada de Infantaria Motorizada) in Florianópolis
 HQ Company 14th Motorized Infantry Brigade (Companhia de Comando da 14ª Brigada de Infantaria Motorizada) in Florianópolis
 23rd Motorized Infantry Battalion (23º Batalhão de Infantaria) in Blumenau 
 62nd Motorized Infantry Battalion (62º Batalhão de Infantaria) in Joinville 
 63rd Motorized Infantry Battalion (63º Batalhão de Infantaria) in Florianópolis 
 28th Field Artillery Group (28º Grupo de Artilharia de Campanha) in Criciúma 
 14th Military Police Platoon (14º Pelotão de Polícia do Exército) in Florianópolis
 15th Mechanized Infantry Brigade (15ª Brigada de Infantaria Mecanizada) in Cascavel
 HQ Company 15th Mechanized Infantry Brigade (Companhia de Comando da 15ª Brigada de Infantaria Mecanizada) in Cascavel
 30th Mechanized Infantry Battalion (30º Batalhão de Infantaria Mecanizado) in Apucarana 
 33rd Mechanized Infantry Battalion (33º Batalhão de Infantaria Mecanizado) in Cascavel 
 34th Mechanized Infantry Battalion (34º Batalhão de Infantaria Mecanizado) in Foz do Iguaçu 
 26th Field Artillery Group (26º Grupo de Artilharia de Campanha) in Guarapuava 
 15th Logistics Battalion (15º Batalhão Logístico) in Cascavel
 15th Motorized Infantry Company (15ª Companhia de Infantaria Motorizada) in Guaíra
 16th Mechanized Cavalry Squadron (16º Esquadrão de Cavalaria Mecanizado) in Francisco Beltrão 
 15th Mechanized Combat Engineer Company (15ª Companhia de Engenharia de Combate Mecanizada) in Palmas 
 15th Mechanized Signals Company (15ª Companhia de Comunicações Mecanizada) in Cascavel

References

Commands of the Brazilian Armed Forces
Regional commands of the Brazilian Army